George Brown Key (11 February 1882 – November 1958) was a Scottish international footballer who played in both the Scottish and English football leagues.

Career
Key was born in the Dennistoun district of Glasgow, and played at Junior level for Parkhead before stepping up to Heart of Midlothian in 1899. With Hearts, Key won the Scottish Cup in 1901 and the following season, was capped for Scotland against Ireland, also appearing in the away leg of the 'World Championship' against Tottenham Hotspur. He was a Scottish Cup runner-up in 1903.

After a disagreement with Hearts over financial matters, Key was signed by Chelsea in 1905 for their first season in English football. The West London club's manager Jacky Robertson had been an international teammate of Key's three years earlier. Key was only a regular in his first year at Chelsea, and left in 1909.

His brother William was also a Scotland international.

References

External links
George Key Scotland profile at London Hearts Supporters Club 
George Key at 11v11.com

1882 births
1958 deaths
Footballers from Glasgow
Association football wing halves
Scottish footballers
Parkhead F.C. players
Heart of Midlothian F.C. players
Chelsea F.C. players
Scotland international footballers
English Football League players
Scottish Football League players
Date of death missing
Place of death missing
Scottish Junior Football Association players
People from Dennistoun
Scotland junior international footballers